Megalonisi ("big island") is an uninhabited islet off the southern coast of the Greek island of Crete in the Libyan Sea that hosts a lighthouse. The islet is in a bay between the capes of Lithino and Kefalas, at Kommos, and close to Gortyn which was the ancient capital of Crete. It is administered within Heraklion regional unit.

Group of islets 

There is a group of four islets in the bay including Papadoplaka (to the west), Megalonisi (with the lighthouse), Mikronisi (also known as Agios Pavlos), and Trafos.

References 

Landforms of Heraklion (regional unit)
Mediterranean islands
Uninhabited islands of Crete
Islands of Greece